FreeCast, Inc. is an American digital media distribution company based in Orlando, Florida. The company, founded by William Mobley in 2011, offers streaming media accessible by web browser. Their primary product is Rabbit TV, a web-based virtual library of entertainment media created and marketed together with A. J. Khubani's company Telebrands.

History and overview  
FreeCast was founded in 2011 by Mobley, and began as a search engine for web video content, locating and categorizing 1.5 million new videos each day, on 5000 categorized channels. The company later developed a Facebook app which allowed users to watch video programming from their Facebook page.

Before Rabbit TV was introduced, the company relied primarily on display advertising for revenue.

Rabbit TV
In 2012, FreeCast and Telebrands turned their service into a physical device. They named the product Rabbit TV, and in the early 2013, began selling it through major US retailers in the form of USB stick. The Rabbit TV USB device grants users access to a web-based guide interface. As of October 2013, a little more than 2 million people bought the device.

Rabbit TV aggregates links to digital media sources, including TV shows, news broadcasts, live sporting events, movies, music, and radio stations.

After reaching one million paid subscribers, the company announced further Rabbit TV development, including more social media integration, multi-device compatibility, and the introduction of a la carte programming packages.

References

External links
 Official website

Internet properties established in 2011
Companies based in Orlando, Florida
Video on demand services
Streaming television
Streaming media systems